OOSA can relate to:

 United Nations Office for Outer Space Affairs
 OOSA, the ICAO code for Salalah Airport
 Object Oriented Structured Analysis